Province 2 (II), also called the Atlantic Province is one of nine ecclesiastical provinces making up the Episcopal Church in the United States of America. It comprises the six dioceses of the State of New York, the two dioceses of the State of New Jersey, the diocese in the Republic of Haiti and the diocese in the Virgin Islands (including both the British and the US Virgin Islands), the diocese of Cuba, and the Convocation of Episcopal Churches in Europe. Lawrence Provenzano of the Diocese of Long Island serves as president and Rosalie Ballentine of the Diocese of the Virgin Islands serves as vice president.

Dioceses of Province II

Diocese of Albany
Diocese of Central New York
Diocese of Cuba
Diocese of Haiti
Diocese of Long Island
Diocese of New Jersey
Diocese of New York
Diocese of Newark
Diocese of Puerto Rico
Diocese of Rochester
Diocese of the Virgin Islands
Diocese of Western New York

Other jurisdictions of Province II

Convocation of Episcopal Churches in Europe

External links 
Province II website

Ecclesiastical provinces of the Episcopal Church in the United States of America